The Reluctant Landlord is a British comedy television series created by Romesh Ranganathan. The series stars Romesh Ranganathan, Sian Gibson and Nick Helm. It premiered in the UK on 30 October 2018. A second and final series premiered on 4 September 2019.

Cast and characters
 Romesh Ranganathan as Romesh
 Sian Gibson as Natasha
 Nick Helm as Lemon
 Phil Davis as Dirty Harry
 Yasmine Akram as Julie
 Marek Larwood as Lee
 Steve Edge as David Foster
 Gary Douglas as Gary
 Ben Sura as Senior Lawyer
 Ceyda Ali as Theresa
 Alexander Molony as Charlie
 Nigel Havers as Dr. Shepherd

Filming
The series was filmed on location in Egham, Surrey. A real pub called The White Lion was used for the fictitious setting of The Seven Swans.

Episodes

Series 1 (2018)

Series 2 (2019)

Christmas Special (2019)

Notes

References

External links

2018 British television series debuts
2019 British television series endings
2010s British sitcoms
English-language television shows
Sky sitcoms
Television shows about landlords